Port McNeill Airport  is located  southeast of Port McNeill, British Columbia, Canada.

See also
 List of airports on Vancouver Island

References

Registered aerodromes in British Columbia
Regional District of Mount Waddington